Tsuneonella dongtanensis is a Gram-negative, rod-shaped and non-spore-forming bacterium from the genus Tsuneonella which has been isolated from tidal flat from the Dongtan Wetland on the Chongming Island in China.

References 

Sphingomonadales
Bacteria described in 2011